Dendryphantes is a genus of jumping spiders that was first described by Carl Ludwig Koch in 1837.

Species
 it contains sixty-nine species, found in Africa, Asia, South America, the Caribbean, Europe, North America, and on Saint Helena:
D. acutus Wesolowska & Haddad, 2014 – Lesotho, South Africa
D. aethiopicus Wesolowska & Tomasiewicz, 2008 – Ethiopia
D. amphibolus Chamberlin, 1916 – Peru
D. andinus Chamberlin, 1916 – Peru
D. arboretus Wesolowska & Cumming, 2008 – Zimbabwe
D. barguzinensis Danilov, 1997 – Russia (South Siberia)
D. barrosmachadoi Caporiacco, 1955 – Venezuela
D. biankii Prószyński, 1979 – Russia (Middle and South Siberia, Far East), Mongolia, China
D. bisquinquepunctatus Taczanowski, 1878 – Peru
D. calus Chamberlin, 1916 – Peru
D. caporiaccoi Roewer, 1951 – Karakorum
D. centromaculatus Taczanowski, 1878 – Peru
D. chuldensis Prószyński, 1982 – Mongolia
D. comatus Karsch, 1880 – Syria
D. czekanowskii Prószyński, 1979 – Russia (Urals to Far East), Japan
D. darchan Logunov, 1993 – Mongolia
D. duodecempunctatus Mello-Leitão, 1943 – Argentina
D. elgonensis Wesolowska & Dawidowicz, 2014 – Kenya
D. fulvipes (Mello-Leitão, 1943) – Chile
D. fulviventris (Lucas, 1846) – Algeria
D. fusconotatus (Grube, 1861) – Russia (Urals to Far East), Mongolia, China
D. hararensis Wesolowska & Cumming, 2008 – Zimbabwe, South Africa
D. hastatus (Clerck, 1757) (type) – Europe, Russia (Europe to Middle and South Siberia), Kazakhstan, China
D. hewitti Lessert, 1925 – Kenya, Tanzania
D. holmi Wesolowska & Dawidowicz, 2014 – Kenya
D. honestus (C. L. Koch, 1846) – Brazil
D. legibilis (Nicolet, 1849) – Chile
D. lepidus (Peckham & Peckham, 1901) – Brazil
D. limpopo Wesolowska & Haddad, 2013 – South Africa
D. linzhiensis Hu, 2001 – China
D. luridus Wesolowska & Dawidowicz, 2014 – Kenya
D. madrynensis Mello-Leitão, 1940 – Argentina
D. matumi Haddad & Wesolowska, 2013 – South Africa
D. mendicus (C. L. Koch, 1846) – Caribbean
D. minutus Wesolowska & Dawidowicz, 2014 – Kenya
D. modestus (Mello-Leitão, 1941) – Argentina
D. mordax (C. L. Koch, 1846) – Chile, Argentina, Uruguay
D. neethlingi Haddad & Wesolowska, 2013 – South Africa
D. nicator Wesolowska & van Harten, 1994 – Yemen
D. nigromaculatus (Keyserling, 1885) – USA
D. niveornatus Mello-Leitão, 1936 – Chile
D. nobilis (C. L. Koch, 1846) – South America
D. ovchinnikovi Logunov & Marusik, 1994 – Kazakhstan, Kyrgyzstan
D. patagonicus Simon, 1905 – Argentina
D. potanini Logunov, 1993 – China
D. praeposterus Denis, 1958 – Afghanistan
D. pseudochuldensis Peng, Xie & Kim, 1994 – China
D. pugnax (C. L. Koch, 1846) – Mexico
D. purcelli Peckham & Peckham, 1903 – St. Helena, South Africa, Lesotho
D. quaesitus Wesolowska & van Harten, 1994 – Yemen
D. rafalskii Wesolowska, 2000 – Zimbabwe, South Africa
D. ravidus (Simon, 1868) – Lithuania, Belarus?
D. reimoseri Roewer, 1951 – Brazil
D. rudis (Sundevall, 1833) – Europe, Turkey, Caucasus, Russia (Europe to Far East), Kazakhstan
D. sacci Simon, 1886 – Bolivia
D. sanguineus Wesolowska, 2011 – Zimbabwe
D. schultzei Simon, 1910 – Namibia, South Africa
D. secretus Wesolowska, 1995 – Kazakhstan
D. sedulus (Blackwall, 1865) – Cape Verde Is.
D. seriatus Taczanowski, 1878 – Peru
D. serratus Wesolowska & Dawidowicz, 2014 – Kenya
D. sexguttatus (Mello-Leitão, 1945) – Argentina
D. silvestris Wesolowska & Haddad, 2013 – South Africa
D. strenuus (C. L. Koch, 1846) – Mexico
D. subtilis Wesolowska & Dawidowicz, 2014 – Kenya
D. tuvinensis Logunov, 1991 – Russia (South Siberia), Kazakhstan, Mongolia
D. villarrica Richardson, 2010 – Chile
D. yadongensis Hu, 2001 – China
D. zygoballoides Chamberlin, 1924 – Mexico

References

External links
 Photograph of D. rudis

Salticidae genera
Cosmopolitan spiders
Salticidae
Taxa named by Carl Ludwig Koch